The 1904–05 Army Cadets men's basketball team represented United States Military Academy during the 1904–05 college men's basketball season. The team captain was Harold Hetrick.

Schedule

|-

References

Army Black Knights men's basketball seasons
Army
Army Cadets Men's Basketball Team
Army Cadets Men's Basketball Team